The Chicago and North Western Railroad Bridge is a bridge on the National Register of Historic Places in Pierre, South Dakota. It was the first permanent bridge across the Missouri River in central South Dakota. The bridge's second span is a swing span; the bridge is the only extant swing bridge in South Dakota. The Chicago and North Western Railway built the bridge in 1907. It was added to the National Register on November 19, 1998. It currently is part of the PRC Subdivision railway line owned and operated by the Rapid City, Pierre and Eastern Railroad.

References

External links
 Chicago and Northwestern Railroad Bridge-Archives Exhibit - South Dakota State Historical Society

Railroad bridges on the National Register of Historic Places in South Dakota
Bridges completed in 1907
Buildings and structures in Pierre, South Dakota
Chicago and North Western Railway
Drawbridges on the National Register of Historic Places
Swing bridges in the United States
National Register of Historic Places in Pierre, South Dakota
Steel bridges in the United States
Pennsylvania truss bridges in the United States